1492 Pictures is an American film production company founded by Chris Columbus, Mark Radcliffe and Michael Barnathan in 1994. The name is a play on Columbus's more famous namesake, Christopher Columbus, and his 1492 landing in the Americas. In addition, the fanfare for 1492 Pictures was composed by Hans Zimmer.

In addition to various Columbus films, 1492 Pictures has produced movies by other directors including Brian Levant (Jingle All the Way), Henry Selick (Monkeybone), Alfonso Cuarón (Harry Potter and the Prisoner of Azkaban), Joe Roth (Christmas with the Kranks), Tim Story (the Fantastic Four films), and Shawn Levy (the Night at the Museum series).

History 
In 1994, Chris Columbus, who successfully directed the first two Home Alone films, and Mrs. Doubtfire, signed a three-year deal with 20th Century Fox, thus eventually led to the creation of a company called 1492 Pictures. Its first feature was Nine Months. The deal was eventually extended in 1997.

In 2009, it signed a deal with Korean company CJ Entertainment for three years, to produce its feature films.

In February 2011, the company bought the rights to the South Korean comedy film Hello Ghost starring Cha Tae-hyun and is scheduled to remake it.
 
In August 2011, the production company released an adaptation of Kathryn Stockett's novel The Help.

In 2012, it signed a deal with ro*co productions to adapt documentary films into scripted feature films.

In 2018, it signed a deal with Netflix to produce feature films for its streaming service.

Films

Theatrical

1990s

2000s

2010s

2020s

Direct-to-video/streaming

2010s

2020s

References

External links 
Variety on the making of The Help

American companies established in 1994
Film production companies of the United States